Garkalne Municipality was a municipality in Vidzeme, Latvia. The municipality was formed in 2007 by reorganization of Garkalne Parish. The seat of the council of the municipality is situated extraterritorially in Berģi, Riga. The population in 2020 was 8,923.

On 1 July 2021, Garkalne Municipality ceased to exist and its territory was merged with Ropaži Municipality.

The main rivers are Lielā Jugla, Mazā Jugla (as a border river between Garkalne municipality and Stopiņi municipality), Krievupe, Jugla, in a small section of the river Tumšupe. The largest lakes in the region are Lielais Baltezers, Langstiņi Lake, Lielais Jūgezers, Mālezers, Mašēnu Lake and Upesciems Ponds. Maltuve swamp is located in the eastern part of the county.

See also 
 Administrative divisions of Latvia (2009)

References 

 
Former municipalities of Latvia